Empress Yin may mean or refer to:

 Empress Yin Lihua (陰麗華) (5–64), wife of Emperor Guangwu of Han
 Empress Yin (He) (陰皇后) (died 102), wife of Emperor He of Han
 Empress Yin Yuying (殷玉英) (died 453), wife of Liu Shao of Liu Song
 Lady Yin (尹夫人), first wife of Emperor Taizong of Song, posthumously honored an empress

Yin